The Spain women's national under-20 volleyball team represents Spain in under-20 international women's volleyball competitions and friendly matches, It is ruled and managed by The Spanish Royal Volleyball Federation That is an affiliate of International Volleyball Federation FIVB and also a part of European Volleyball Confederation CEV.

Results

FIVB U20 World Championship
 Champions   Runners up   Third place   Fourth place

Europe U19 Championship
 Champions   Runners up   Third place   Fourth place

Team

Current squad
The following is the Spanish roster in the 2016 European U19 Championship.

Head coach:  Jose Miguel Serrato

References

External links
 *Official website

Volleyball
National women's under-20 volleyball teams
Volleyball in Spain